High School Rapper 2 is a South Korean Hip hop survival television show.

Contestants
Color key

Team Finalization - Your Personal Story (Episodes 2 - 3) 

Results for students Kim Eun-ji and Alice weren't disclosed. Afterwards, Deepflow became the team's mentor.

Afterwards, the team chose Hangzoo and Boi B as their mentors.

Afterwards, Groovy Room was chosen as the team's mentors.

Bin Ha-neul's results weren't disclosed. Afterwards, the team chose San E and Cheetah for their mentors.

Team Battle - Textbook Literature (Episodes 4-5)

Team Battle - Collaboration with Mentors (Episodes 5 - 6)

Semi-Final (Episode 7)

Final (Episode 8)

Notes

References

High School Rapper 2 contestants
High School Rapper